Geoplaninae is a subfamily of land planarians endemic to the Neotropical region. However, one species, Obama nungara has been introduced in Europe.

Description
The subfamily Geoplaninae was initially defined by Ogren and Kawakatsu (1990) for land planarians which have a broad creeping sole, mouth in the second half of the body, dorsal testes, subepithelial longitudinal musculature well developed and parenchymal longitudinal musculature absent or not well developed. The eyes contour the anterior region in a single row and posteriorly form several rows, which may spread onto the dorsum, and extend to the posterior end of the body. However, most, if not all, of these characteristics are not exclusive and cannot be considered a synapomorphy of the group. Some characteristics have also been reverted in some genera. Nevertheless, phylogenetic studies have revealed that Geoplaninae is indeed a monophyletic group.

Genera
Currently the land planarians in the subfamily Geoplaninae are grouped into 9 tribes and 37 genera:

Adinoplanini
Adinoplana

Geoplanini
Amaga 
Anophthalmoplana 
Barreirana 
Bogga 
Cephaloflexa 
Choeradoplana 
Cratera 
Difroehlichia 
Geobia 
Geoplana 
Gigantea 
Imbira 
Issoca 
Luteostriata 
Matuxia 
Notogynaphallia 
Obama 
Paraba 
Pasipha 
Piima 
Pseudogeoplana 
Supramontana 
Transandiplana 
Winsoria 
Xerapoa

Gusanini
Gusana

Haranini
Harana

Inakayaliini
Inakayalia

Myoplanini
Myoplana

Polycladini
Polycladus

Sarcoplanini
Liana 
Mapuplana 
Pichidamas 
Sarcoplana 
Wallmapuplana

Timymini
Timyma

References

Geoplanidae